Jerryd Andrew Bayless (born August 20, 1988) is an American former  professional basketball player. He played a year of college basketball for the Arizona Wildcats after playing high school basketball at St. Mary's High School in Phoenix. He was selected 11th overall in the 2008 NBA draft by the Indiana Pacers and was then traded to the Portland Trail Blazers.

College career
As a freshman at Arizona in 2007–08, Bayless led the Wildcats in scoring with average of 19.7 points per game with 45.8% shooting (40.7% 3-point shooting). He also averaged 4.0 assists and 2.7 rebounds and 35.7 minutes per game in 30 games. He became the first freshman in school history to lead Arizona in scoring, as well as the first freshman to win team MVP honors since Sean Elliott did so in 1985–86. He earned multiple awards including All-Pac-10 second team and All-Freshman honors, First Team All-District honors by the National Association of Basketball Coaches (NABC) and United States Basketball Writers Association (USBWA), named Honorable Mention All-America by The Associated Press, and was a finalist for the Wooden Award. The Wildcats finished the regular season with a 19–14 record (8–10 in the Pac-10), making it through to the first round of the NCAA tournament where they lost to West Virginia. On April 5, 2008, he declared for the NBA draft, forgoing his final three years of college eligibility.

Professional career

Portland Trail Blazers (2008–2010)
Bayless was selected by the Indiana Pacers with the 11th overall pick in the 2008 NBA draft. He was subsequently traded by Indiana with Ike Diogu to the Portland Trail Blazers in exchange for Jarrett Jack, Josh McRoberts and Brandon Rush on July 9. At the 2008 Las Vegas Summer League, he earned the Most Valuable Player award after leading the league in scoring at 29.8 points per game and leading the Trail Blazers to a 3–2 win–loss record.

Bayless scored a career-high 31 points on December 23, 2009 against the San Antonio Spurs, setting a franchise record for points by a Trail Blazer making his first career start.

New Orleans Hornets (2010)
Bayless was traded by the Trail Blazers to the New Orleans Hornets in exchange for a 2011 first-round draft pick that would become Tobias Harris on October 23, 2010.

Toronto Raptors (2010–2012)
Bayless was traded by New Orleans with Peja Stojaković to the Toronto Raptors in exchange for David Andersen, Marcus Banks and Jarrett Jack on November 20, 2010. On December 11, 2010, he tied his career-high of 31 points against the Detroit Pistons. He recorded a double-double with 11 points and 10 assists on February 22, 2011 against the Charlotte Bobcats, tying career-highs by shooting 11-of-12 from the free throw line, making him the first NBA player to record a points/assists double-double without a made field goal since Magic Johnson did so in 1996.

In the lockout shortened 2011–12 season, Bayless set career-highs in scoring (11.4 points), assists (3.8), FG% (.424), 3P% (.423) and FT% (.852) in 31 games (11 starts).

Memphis Grizzlies (2012–2014)
On July 13, 2012, Bayless signed a two-year deal with the Memphis Grizzlies. On June 30, 2013, he exercised his player option with the Grizzlies for the 2013–14 season.

Boston Celtics (2014)
On January 7, 2014, Bayless was traded to the Boston Celtics in a three-team trade that involved the Grizzlies and the Oklahoma City Thunder.

Milwaukee Bucks (2014–2016)

On July 31, 2014, Bayless signed with the Milwaukee Bucks. He had a solid first half of the 2014–15 season before his form dropped post All-Star break. During the season, Bayless was often relied upon to carry a significant load as he knew the system and head coach Jason Kidd's trust. This was especially true in the first week that followed the All-Star break, as newly acquired Michael Carter-Williams was still nursing a toe-injury.

On December 28, 2015, Bayless returned to the Bucks' lineup after missing 11 games with a left ankle sprain and led Milwaukee with 19 points and seven assists off the bench in a loss to the Dallas Mavericks. He later missed six games in early January with the same injury, and a further five games in late February with a left knee injury.

Philadelphia 76ers (2016–2018)
On July 13, 2016, Bayless signed with the Philadelphia 76ers. Due to a left wrist injury, Bayless was assigned to the Delaware 87ers of the NBA Development League on November 14 for an injury rehabilitation assignment. He was recalled on November 16 and made his season debut for the 76ers on November 21 after missing the first 13 games of the season; he scored four points in 16 minutes against the Miami Heat. He made three appearances for the 76ers before the injury forced him to the sidelines again. On December 15, he was ruled out for the rest of the season after he underwent successful surgery to repair a torn ligament in his left wrist.

Bayless started the first seven games of the 2017–18 season before quickly lost his starting job and then had his thumb injury resurface. After missing six games, he returned to the rotation, but he struggled with his shot and defense. With the young talent that was emerging on the roster, Bayless found himself out of the rotation by mid-January.

Bayless sat out the start of the 2018–19 season to rehabilitate a hyperextended right knee.

Minnesota Timberwolves (2018–2019)
On November 12, 2018, Bayless was traded to the Minnesota Timberwolves, along with Robert Covington, Dario Šarić and a 2022 second-round pick, in exchange for Jimmy Butler and Justin Patton. He made his season debut on December 21 against the San Antonio Spurs. On January 30, 2019, he recorded 19 points and a career-high 12 assists in a 99–97 overtime win over the Memphis Grizzlies. It was his first double-double since November 7, 2015, and just the fifth of his career.

Career statistics

NBA

Regular season

|-
| style="text-align:left;"| 
| style="text-align:left;"| Portland
| 53 || 0 || 12.4 || .365 || .259 || .806 || 1.1 || 1.5 || .3 || .0 || 4.3
|-
| style="text-align:left;"| 
| style="text-align:left;"| Portland
| 74 || 11 || 17.6 || .414 || .315 || .831 || 1.6 || 2.3 || .4 || .1 || 8.5 
|-
| style="text-align:left;"| 
| style="text-align:left;"| New Orleans
| 11 || 0 || 13.5 || .347 || .214 || .765 || 1.4 || 2.5 || .2 || .1 || 4.5 
|-
| style="text-align:left;"| 
| style="text-align:left;"| Toronto
| 60 || 14 || 22.4 || .429 || .348 || .810 || 2.5 || 4.0 || .6 || .1 || 10.0
|-
| style="text-align:left;"| 
| style="text-align:left;"| Toronto
| 31 || 11 || 22.7 || .424 || .423 || .852 || 2.1 || 3.8 || .8 || .1 || 11.4
|-
| style="text-align:left;"| 
| style="text-align:left;"| Memphis
| 80 || 4 || 22.1 || .419 || .353 || .836 || 2.2 || 3.3 || .7 || .2 || 8.7
|-
| style="text-align:left;"| 
| style="text-align:left;"| Memphis
| 31 || 5 || 21.0 || .377 || .301 || .789 || 1.9 || 2.1 || .6 || .2 || 8.1
|-
| style="text-align:left;"| 
| style="text-align:left;"| Boston
| 41 || 14 || 25.3 || .418 || .395 || .803 || 2.1 || 3.1 || 1.0 || .1 || 10.1
|-
| style="text-align:left;"| 
| style="text-align:left;"| Milwaukee
| 77 || 4 || 22.3 || .426 || .308 || .883 || 2.7 || 3.0 || .8 || .2 || 7.8
|-
| style="text-align:left;"| 
| style="text-align:left;"| Milwaukee
| 52 || 18 || 28.9 || .423 || .437 || .778 || 2.7 || 3.1 || .9 || .2 || 10.4
|-
| style="text-align:left;"| 
| style="text-align:left;"| Philadelphia
| 3 || 1 || 23.7 || .344 || .400 || .900 || 4.0 || 4.3 || .0 || .0 || 11.0
|-
| style="text-align:left;"| 
| style="text-align:left;"| Philadelphia
| 39 || 11 || 23.7 || .416 || .370 || .795 || 2.1 || 1.4 || .6 || .2 || 7.9
|-
| style="text-align:left;"| 
| style="text-align:left;"| Minnesota
| 34 || 6 || 19.3 || .357 || .296 || .571 || 1.8 || 3.5 || .5 || .1 || 6.1
|- class="sortbottom"
| style="text-align:center;" colspan="2"| Career
| 586 || 99 || 21.4 || .411 || .361 || .818 || 2.1 || 2.9 || .6 || .1 || 8.4

Playoffs

|-
| style="text-align:left;"| 2009
| style="text-align:left;"| Portland
| 2 || 0 || 5.5 || .333 || .000 || .667 || .5 || .0 || .0 || .5 || 3.0
|-
| style="text-align:left;"| 2010
| style="text-align:left;"| Portland
| 6 || 2 || 27.7 || .431 || .400 || .792 || 2.7 || 3.8 || .3 || .0 || 13.5
|-
| style="text-align:left;"| 2013
| style="text-align:left;"| Memphis
| 15 || 0 || 21.3 || .358 || .305 || .885 || 2.0 || 2.1 || .5 || .3 || 9.3
|-
| style="text-align:left;"| 2015
| style="text-align:left;"| Milwaukee
| 6 || 0 || 20.0 || .343 || .286 || .765 || 2.5 || 3.0 || .3 || .3 || 6.5
|-
| style="text-align:left;"| 2018
| style="text-align:left;"| Philadelphia
| 1 || 0 || 2.0 || – || – || – || .0 || .0 || .0 || .0 || .0
|-
| style="text-align:center;" colspan="2"| Career
| 30 || 2 || 20.6 || .374 || .317 || .814 || 2.1 || 2.4 || .4 || .3 || 8.8

College

|-
| style="text-align:left;"| 2007–08
| style="text-align:left;"| Arizona
| 30 || 30 || 35.7 || .458 || .407 || .839 || 2.7 || 4.0 || 1.0 || .1 || 19.7

Honors and awards

High school
2007 First-team Parade All-American
Named to the 2007 USA Basketball Junior National Select Team
Named to the 2006 USA Men's U18 National Team which went on to win a gold medal in the FIBA World Championship
Four-time Arizona Republic All-Arizona team selection (2004, 2005, 2006 and 2007)
2006 Fourth-team Parade All-American
Ranked as the No. 9 overall recruit and the No. 2 shooting guard by both Scout.com and Rivals.com.

College
2008 Second-team All-Pac-10
2018 University of Arizona Ring of Honor

See also

2006 high school boys basketball All-Americans

References

External links

Milwaukee Bucks bio
Official website
Arizona bio

1988 births
Living people
American expatriate basketball people in Canada
American men's basketball players
Arizona Wildcats men's basketball players
Basketball players from Phoenix, Arizona
Boston Celtics players
Indiana Pacers draft picks
McDonald's High School All-Americans
Memphis Grizzlies players
Milwaukee Bucks players
Minnesota Timberwolves players
New Orleans Hornets players
Parade High School All-Americans (boys' basketball)
Philadelphia 76ers players
Portland Trail Blazers players
Shooting guards
Toronto Raptors players